Taras Bulba is a rhapsody for orchestra by the Czech composer Leoš Janáček.  It was composed between 1915 and 1918 and is one of the most famous of Janáček's works. It is based on the novel by Nikolai Gogol.

The first version of the work was finished on 2 July 1915, but Janáček later revised it and made substantial changes. The second, almost complete, version was finished on 29 March 1918. Taras Bulba was premiered at the National Theatre in Brno on 9 October 1921, conducted by František Neumann. The composition was dedicated to "our army, the armed protector of our nation". It was published by Hudební matice in 1924 in piano duet arrangement made by Břetislav Bakala. In 1927 the full score was published with further changes. Janáček described the piece as a "rhapsody" and chose three episodes from Gogol's story to portray in this programmatic work.

Description

Instrumentation
The music is scored for piccolo (doubling 3rd flute), 2 flutes, 2 oboes, cor anglais, 2 clarinets (1st doubling E-flat clarinet), 2 bassoons, contrabassoon (doubling 3rd bassoon), 4 horns, 3 trumpets, 3 trombones, tuba, timpani, snare drum, suspended cymbal (played with snare drum sticks), triangle, bells, harp, organ and strings.

Movements
The music is in three movements:

Footnotes

References
Leoš Janáček: Taras Bulba. Rapsodia per orchestra. Partitura. (Score) Prague: Editio Supraphon, 1980. H 3616p

External links

 Part 1 - The Death of Andrej (YouTube)
 Part 3 – The Prophecy and Death of Taras Bulba (YouTube)

Compositions by Leoš Janáček
Adaptations of works by Nikolai Gogol
Music for orchestra and organ
1915 compositions
1918 compositions
1927 compositions
Rhapsodies